4 Engineer Support Regiment is a regiment of the Canadian Military Engineers headquartered at CFB Gagetown, New Brunswick.  It is tasked to provide general engineer support to the whole of the Canadian Armed Forces.

4 ESR was officially formed in 1993 when 4 Combat Engineer Regiment (4 CER) returned from CFB Lahr in Germany when 4 Canadian Mechanized Brigade Group was stood down. 4 CER absorbed 22 Field Squadron, a detached and independent unit affiliated with 2 Combat Engineer Regiment. 22 Field Squadron was stationed in CFB Gagetown supporting the 2nd Battalion The Royal Canadian Regiment Battle Group, the Combat Training Centre and 4 CER in Germany.

On 1 June 2022, the perpetuation of No. 2 Construction Battalion of the First World War Canadian Expeditionary Force was assigned to the Canadian Military Engineers, with 4 Engineer Support Regiment being responsible for ongoing public recognition of the perpetuation.

Lineage

4 Engineer Support Regiment 

 Originated on 17 June 1977, in Lahr, Germany, as 4 Combat Engineer Regiment.
 Redesignated on 4 September 1992, as 4th Engineer Support Regiment.
 Redesignated on 30 September 1993, as 4 Engineer Support Regiment.

4 Field Engineer Squadron 

 Originated on 1 August 1951, in Petawawa, Ontario, as 59th Independent Field Squadron, RCE.
 Redesignated on 16 October 1953, as 4th Field Squadron, RCE.
 Redesignated on 30 April 1958, as 4 Field Squadron.
 Redesignated on 21 May 1975, as 4 Field Engineer Squadron.
 Reorganized as a regiment on 17 June 1977, and Designated as 4 Combat Engineer Regiment.

Sub-units 
The unit currently consists of:

 Regimental Headquarters
 42 Field Squadron 
 43 Counter Improvised Explosive Device Squadron
 45 Support Squadron
 48 Combat Service Support Squadron.

See also

 Military history of Canada
 History of the Canadian Army
 Canadian Forces
 List of armouries in Canada

References

4 ESR ATD 12/13

Order of precedence

Engineer regiments of Canada
Military units and formations established in 1977